Issue VI is the sixth full-length album by the German thrash metal/death metal band Dew-Scented.

A special edition, limited to 5000 worldwide, comes with a bonus DVD, with 17 live tracks from various shows between 2002-2005, and a video clip for the song "Turn to Ash". A colored vinyl edition was released by Benihana Records.

Track listing
 "Processing Life" – 4:09
 "Rituals of Time" – 5:06
 "Turn to Ash" – 3:08
 "Ruins of Hope" – 4:12
 "Out of the Self" – 3:41
 "The Prison of Reason" – 4:49
 "Bled Dry" – 3:57
 "In Defeat" – 3:52
 "Never to Return" – 4:22
 "Vortex" – 4:15
 "Conceptual End" – 3:18
 "Evil Dead" (Zeke Cover) – 1:01

Bonus Tracks:
 "Full-Blown Revenge" (Japanese Bonus Track)
 "The Torrent" (American Bonus Track) – 4:31

Personnel
Leffe Jensen – vocals
Hendrik Bache – guitar
Alexander Pahl – bass
Uwe Werning – drums

2005 albums
Dew-Scented albums